The Kerlan Award is a literary award given by the University of Minnesota's Kerlan Collection, a special library focusing on children's literature. Many awards focus on the finished product, but the Kerlan Award is given based on the creative process. It is given "In recognition of singular attainments in the creation of children's literature and in appreciation for generous donation of unique resources to the Kerlan Collection for the study of children's literature."

Criteria for award
The writer or illustrator must be represented within the Kerlan Collection
The award should promote the goals of the collection and,
that 'contribution' would emphasize the creative process.
Awards may be given to a living person or posthumously.

Further refinement of the original guidelines have defined 'singular attainments' as peer acceptance, volume of work and a high standard of quality and the term  'generous donation' was tied directly to high research value in the area of children's literature.

The Kerlan Collection
Irvine Kerlan, M.D. was a Minnesota native who earned his medical degree through the University of Minnesota. Throughout a successful medical career, which included working for the Food and Drug Administration (FDA), and lecturing throughout the United States he also collected children's books, artwork and manuscripts. His collection was so well respected that he loaned many of his piece out to libraries and museums both within the United States and abroad.

As his collecting hobby advanced, he began writing to authors and illustrators requesting meetings. He would invite them to his home, or visit them as his lecture schedule allowed. He often had books and manuscripts inscribed by these artists and writers. He became an Honorary Consultant on Children's Books for the Smithsonian Institution from 1958 to 1961 and had three of his exhibits travel through Europe, Asia and the Middle East after being sponsored by the U. S. Department of State.

Kerlan was killed in an automobile accident in 1963 and his collection of over 9,000 books, 180 manuscripts and many illustrations was willed to the University of Minnesota. There were also many types of correspondence with authors, artists, and editors.

Kerlan was the first of many estates given to the University of Minnesota libraries, and together these collections have become known as the Children's Literature Research Center (CLRC). Many famous authors and illustrators have donated works to the collection as well. Lois Lowry has given her original corrected manuscripts for thirteen novels, including her Newbery Award winning Number the Stars and The Giver. James Marshall has donated hundreds of sketches including many from the George and Martha and Miss Nelson series. 

There are over 1,800 authors and illustrators represented in the collection with an item count of over 200,000.

History of The Kerlan Award
The Kerlan Award was created to celebrate the 25th anniversary of the Kelan Collection coming to the University of Minnesota library. It was given the distinction of being a Presidential Citation at its creation.

Kerlan Award recipients

See also

Newbery Medal
Caldecott Medal for outstanding American picture books
Carnegie Medal for outstanding children's books published in the United Kingdom
Coretta Scott King Award for outstanding children's books related to the African-American experience
Guardian Award for works of children's literature written by British or Commonwealth authors
Kate Greenaway Medal for outstanding works of illustration in children's literature from the United Kingdom
Laura Ingalls Wilder Medal for outstanding lifetime contribution to children's literature

References

External links
 , Kerlan Award
 , Kerlan Collection
  Author & Illustrator holdings
  Kerlan Collection Notable Holdings

Awards established in 1975
American children's literary awards
University of Minnesota